Slaves of Love is a 1924 German silent drama film directed by Carl Boese and starring Ellen Kürti, Cläre Lotto, and Olga Engl.

The film's sets were designed by the art director Peter Rochelsberg and Otto Völckers. It was shot at the Emelka Studios in Munich.

Cast
Ellen Kürti
Cläre Lotto
Olga Engl
Clementine Plessner
Charles Willy Kayser
Albert Steinrück
Karl Falkenberg
Leopold von Ledebur
Emil Höfer
Ludwig Rex
Julius Stettner

See also
The Wedding of Valeni (1914)

References

External links

Films of the Weimar Republic
German silent feature films
Films directed by Carl Boese
German black-and-white films
Bavaria Film films
Films shot at Bavaria Studios
1924 drama films
German drama films
Films based on works by Ludwig Ganghofer
German films based on plays
Silent drama films
1920s German films
1920s German-language films